The Miles M.35 Libellula was a tandem wing research aircraft built by Miles Aircraft as a precursor to a proposed naval carrier fighter. It was named after the Libellula, a genus of dragonflies.

Design and development
Carrier aircraft are at a disadvantage compared to land-based equivalents because they require wing-folding systems increasing the aircraft's weight at the expense of payload. Adaptions of single-engined tail-dragger land-based aircraft typically had poor visibility during landing.
1941, Miles became aware of the high accident rates for carrier landings. They began private venture work on unorthodox configurations potentially solving the visibility problem and the complications of folding wings required for storage of ship-borne aircraft.

While contemplating these problems, George Herbert Miles visited the Aeroplane and Armament Experimental Establishment at RAF Boscombe Down. He saw the Westland-Delanne tandem wing Lysander, with a second wing with tip rudders in place of the conventional vertical stabilizer and tailplane arrangement (The wing was added to carry a heavy four-gun turret for ground attack). Miles realized a tandem-wing fighter could be built to fit onto carrier elevators without folding. In addition, the pilot could be seated in the nose for an excellent view during landings. To Miles, the tandem wing configuration appeared to be the answer... provided it was "aerodynamically feasible".

Advantages of a tandem-winged carrier fighter include: small size, manoeuvrability, excellent visibility, reduced weight, and reduced drag.
Avoiding the bureaucratic process of submitting an unorthodox design for official consideration, Miles built and flew a mock-up. Miles tasked Ray Bournon with designing a small single-engined single-seat aircraft, the Miles M.35. Without the interference of bureaucrats, design and construction was completed in six weeks. The result was a small wooden aircraft with a high-set front wing and low-set rear wing, fixed tricycle undercarriage, and pusher propeller, with the engine in the rear of the fuselage, and the pilot sitting in the front of the fuselage.

The front wing was moderately-tapered with a straight leading-edge, while the rear wing was in three parts: an unswept center section to clear the propeller and supporting the main undercarriage legs, plus outer sections from about ¼ span swept back at approximately 30°, supporting large end-plate fins at the tips. The fuselage connected all the components, and carried the engine, fuel, cockpit, and nose undercarriage.

Operational history
Flight trials of the M.35 were to commence in 1942, but Miles' chief test pilot was reluctant to take off in the aircraft, whereupon George Miles took over. The M.35 proved to be reluctant to take-off; eventually, Miles discovered if the throttle was closed sharply at speed, the little aircraft leapt into the air. The initial flight on 1 May 1942 was not a success, with the aircraft almost uncontrollable due to an incorrect center-of-gravity. Miles completed this flight successfully.
Later flights were more successful after ballasting the aircraft correctly, proving the tandem-wing layout could be useful as a naval fighter. Further flying was carried out in support of Miles other tandem-wing projects.

Miles immediately submitted a proposal for a naval fighter based on the arrangement – called 'Libellula' – to the Admiralty and the Ministry of Aircraft Product.
Building the M.35 without official authority, the company was castigated by the Ministry of Aircraft Production which, along with the Admiralty, rejected the proposed fighter.
Miles were encouraged by the results from the M.35. They drew a bomber design on the same principles. This was submitted to the bureaucracy in July 1942 to meet the requirements of specification B.11/41; Miles immediately started work on a scale version – the M.39B.

Specifications (Miles M.35 Libellula)

See also

References

Notes

Bibliography
 
 Brown, Eric. "The Lovelorn Libellula." Air Enthusiast Five November 1977 – February 1978. Bromley, Kent, UK: Pilot Press Ltd., 1977. pp.58-62, 77.
 
 Buttler, Tony. British Secret Projects Fighters & Bombers, 1935–1950. Hinckley: Midland Publications, 2004. .

Further reading
 
 Bridgman, Leonard (ed.) Jane's fighting aircraft of World War II. London: Crescent, 1998. 
 "The Miles 'Dragonflies'" Aeroplane Monthly, June 1973. London: IPC Media Ltd. ISSN 0143-7240.

External links

 
 
 
Miles Tandem Monoplanes Flight 1944
pictures of Miles Tandem Monoplanes – Flight 1944
 

1940s British experimental aircraft
Cancelled military aircraft projects of the United Kingdom
Single-engined pusher aircraft
Libellula
Tandem-wing aircraft
Aircraft first flown in 1942

ja:マイルズ リベルラ